The Naknek Formation is a Mesozoic geologic formation. Plesiosaur remains are among the fossils that have been recovered from its strata.

See also

 Plesiosaur stratigraphic distribution
 Valley of Ten Thousand Smokes

Jurassic Alaska